Croton grandilevus is a species of croton endemic to central and southern Brazil and to Paraguay.

Medicine 
Research into the species has demonstrated antiviral potential from the alkaloids found in its leaves.  In particular, the corydine and norisoboldine compounds contain anti-HIV activity, inhibiting specific enzyme activity.

References 

grandilevus
Flora of Brazil
Flora of Paraguay